Steve Brûlé (born January 15, 1975) is a Canadian former professional ice hockey player. He last played competitively with Jonquière Marquis of the Ligue Nord-Américaine de Hockey. He played in the National Hockey League with the New Jersey Devils and Colorado Avalanche.

Playing career
As a youth, Brûlé played in the 1988 Quebec International Pee-Wee Hockey Tournament with a minor ice hockey team from Montreal.

Brûlé was drafted 143rd overall in the 1993 NHL Entry Draft by the New Jersey Devils. He was drafted from St. Jean Lynx of the QMJHL where he was a prolific scorer as a junior winning the Michel Bergeron Trophy in 1992–93. Brûlé made his professional debut at the end of the 1994–95 season with Devils affiliate, the Albany River Rats of the AHL, helping the Rats capture the Calder Cup with 14 points in 14 playoff games.

Due to a strong Devils outfit, Brûlé spent the next five years with the River Rats, where he was a dependable scoring force. At the end of the 1999–2000 season with the River Rats, Brûlé was among a handful of players that made up their taxi squad of the Devils in case of injury or slump. When the Devils played against the Toronto Maple Leafs, Brûlé joined the Devils for a single game in place of Sergei Brylin. However, when the Devils defeated the defending champion Dallas Stars, Brûlé, without a regular season game in his career, had his name engraved on the Stanley Cup.

Brûlé then signed with the Detroit Red Wings on July 20, 2000, and failing to make the team was assigned to the Manitoba Moose of the IHL.  Brûlé then spent the 2001–02 season with the Cincinnati Mighty Ducks of the AHL before he signed with the Colorado Avalanche on July 22, 2002. Steve made the Avalanche's opening night roster for the 2002–03 season and made his NHL regular season debut, but was subsequently sent to affiliate the Hershey Bears.

Brûlé re-signed with the Avalanche on August 26, 2003, but again spent the year with the Bears, placing 2nd on the team in points with 58. During the 2004 NHL Lockout Brûlé left for Europe signing with German team Krefeld Pinguine of the DEL on July 22, 2004. After the Lockout Brûlé opted to stay in Europe spending time in the Austrian, and Swiss leagues.

After seven years abroad on June 23, 2011, Brûlé signed a one-year contract returning to play in Canada with the Saguenay Marquis of the LNAH.

Career statistics

Regular season and playoffs

Awards and achievements

References

External links 

Picture of Steve Brule's Name on the 2000 Stanley Cup Plaque

1975 births
Albany River Rats players
Canadian ice hockey forwards
Cincinnati Mighty Ducks players
Colorado Avalanche players
Füchse Duisburg players
Hershey Bears players
Kassel Huskies players
Krefeld Pinguine players
Living people
Manitoba Moose (IHL) players
New Jersey Devils players
Saint-Jean Lynx players
Ice hockey people from Montreal
Stanley Cup champions
Canadian expatriate ice hockey players in Germany
New Jersey Devils draft picks
Graz 99ers players
EHC Visp players
HC Thurgau players
ECH Chur players